Deukmejian is an Armenian surname. Notable people with the surname include:

George Deukmejian (1928–2018) the 35th Governor of California from 1983 to 1991 and Attorney General of California from 1979 to 1983
Gloria Deukmejian (born 1930), former first lady of California (1983–1991) and the widow of former California governor George Deukmejian

Armenian-language surnames